Streptomyces roseolus is a bacterium species from the genus of Streptomyces which has been isolated from soil in Russia. Streptomyces roseolus produces chitosanase and isoflavones
.

See also

See also 
 List of Streptomyces species

References

External links
Type strain of Streptomyces roseolus at BacDive -  the Bacterial Diversity Metadatabase

roseolus
Bacteria described in 1958